Quzan or Qowzan may refer to:
 Quzan, Hamadan
 Quzan, Razavi Khorasan
 Quzan, Zanjan
 Kozan, Adana in Turkey